Manuel Ernesto Aguirre (born Buenos Aires, 28 July 1959) is a former Argentine rugby union player. He played as a prop.

Aguirre played for Asociación Alumni in the Nacional de Clubes.

He had 3 caps for Argentina, without scoring. He had his first game at the 15-13 loss to England, at 4 August 1990, in Buenos Aires, aged 31 years old, in a friendly. He was called for the 1991 Rugby World Cup, where he had his last game for the "Pumas" at the 35-12 loss to Samoa, in Pontypridd.

References

External links
Manuel Aguirre International Statistics

1959 births
Living people
Argentine people of Basque descent
Argentine rugby union players
Argentina international rugby union players
Asociación Alumni players
Rugby union props
Rugby union players from Buenos Aires